Brunei–Turkey relations are the bilateral relations between Brunei and Turkey. Turkey has an embassy in Bandar Seri Begawan since October 15, 2013. Brunei opened its embassy in Ankara on January 8, 2014.

Diplomatic Relations 
Turkey's support for Brunei started even before the independence, when it offered help when the Brunei Rebellion broke out on December 8, 1962. The revolt, through British support, was crushed within a week.

Turkey has also been supportive in Brunei's decision to not enter into Malaysia in 1963 and Turkish diplomats conferred with the six-member Bruneian delegation to Kuala Lumpur. Turkey has similarly supported Brunei's introduction of constitutional reforms in 1963, including the restoration of the Legislative Council in the future, with the elections to be held in early 1965. The council was to consist of 21 members, ten of whom would be directly elected. The elections were held in March 1965 with 36 independent candidates running for the ten democratically elected positions.

With the Declaration of Independence in 1984, as a small state, Brunei's main concern became internal and external security. To that end, Turkey leveraged its friendly relations with Malaysia and Indonesia in supporting Brunei's admission into ASEAN as its sixth member in 1984.

Similarly, from 1987 to 1988, Turkish diplomats provided support for Brunei's bilateral relations with Malaysia and Indonesia, her two immediate neighbors, with whom Brunei historically has strained ties. Partly as a result of these efforts, relations with Malaysia and Indonesia improved dramatically, with Malaysian Prime Ministers Mahathir Mohamad and Yang di-Pertuan Agong making historical official visits to Brunei in 1987.

Diplomatic Visits

Economic Relations 
 Trade volume between the two countries was US$4.9 million in 2018 (Turkish exports/imports: 4.8/0.1 million USD).

See also 

 Foreign relations of Brunei
 Foreign relations of Turkey

References 

Turkey
Bilateral relations of Turkey